The Aerospool WT10 Advantic is a Slovak amateur-built aircraft, designed and being developed by Aerospool of Prievidza, introduced at the AERO Friedrichshafen show in 2013. The aircraft is intended to be supplied as a kit for amateur construction.

Design and development
The WT10 Advantic is a development of the commercially successful two-seat Aerospool WT9 Dynamic. The WT10 features a cantilever low-wing, a three to four-seat enclosed cockpit under a forward-hinged bubble canopy, plus a rear seat access hatch, retractable tricycle landing gear and a single engine in tractor configuration.

The WT10 is made from composite materials. The prototype used a  Rotax 914 turbocharged four-stroke powerplant, driving an MT-Propeller.

The aircraft was first flown on 11 April 2013. As of March 2017 it was still indicated on the manufacturer's website as under development.

Specifications (WT10 Advantic)

References

External links

Homebuilt aircraft
Single-engined pusher aircraft
2010s Slovak sport aircraft
Low-wing aircraft
Aircraft first flown in 2013